Mario Beltrami (2 May 1902 – 7 September 1987) was an Italian painter. His work was part of the painting event in the art competition at the 1932 Summer Olympics.

References

1902 births
1987 deaths
20th-century Italian painters
20th-century Italian male artists
Italian male painters
Olympic competitors in art competitions
People from Casalmaggiore